Hasdeu is a Romanian surname. Notable people with the surname include:

 Bogdan Petriceicu Hasdeu (1838–1907)
 Bogdan Petriceicu Hasdeu National College
 Iulia Hasdeu (1869–1888)
 Iulia Hasdeu Castle, a folly house

See also
Hâjdău

Romanian-language surnames